Różanówka  (formerly German Rosenthal) is a village in the administrative district of Gmina Siedlisko, within Nowa Sól County, Lubusz Voivodeship, in western Poland.

References

Villages in Nowa Sól County